This is a list of the 21 members of the European Parliament for the Greece in the 2014 to 2019 session, as elected on 25 May 2014 European Parliament election in Greece.

List

References

External links
 European parliament website

Greece
List
2014